Good Shepherd Lutheran College is a Prep to Year 12 campus that serves the families of the Noosa district. It is located in Noosaville.

History and development
The college is situated on 4.6 hectares (11 acres) which was once the site of the Noosa Drive-In. In addition, the college has a licence to use oval space adjacent to its property. The College commenced its operations in 1985, using a temporary demountable building which was constructed through the generous support of local members of the Lutheran Congregation and the Lutheran Church of Australia.

The Primary School was opened on 28 January 1986 with an enrolment of 66 students. In 1992, the Primary School was handed over by the Parish to the Lutheran Church of Australia, Queensland District which opened Good Shepherd Lutheran College, offering classes from Year 1 to Year 8. In 1996, classes were offered from Prep to Year 12 for the first time.

An agreement was reached between the College and the Noosa Council in 2002 which provided for the acquisition of 1.1ha of additional land, on which a gymnasium, extra classrooms and a swimming pool are now located.

House system
Four houses operate across the college as follows:

Googa Camp
In Semester Two, Year 10 students spend four weeks at Googa outdoor education centre. The centre is set in the ranges outside Blackbutt in the South Burnett region. This is an integral part of the Year 10 curriculum at Good Shepherd and all students are required to participate.

Scholarships
The college offers a large number of scholarships for students every year. Interested students are required to undertake an exam on campus, usually in May of the year previous to entering Year 8, 11 and Year 6 (Primary Academic Scholarship only).

References

Private primary schools in Queensland
Private secondary schools in Queensland
Educational institutions established in 1986
Junior School Heads Association of Australia Member Schools
Lutheran schools in Australia
Schools on the Sunshine Coast, Queensland
1986 establishments in Australia
High schools and secondary schools affiliated with the Lutheran Church
Elementary and primary schools affiliated with the Lutheran Church